The Mexican Dirty War was the Mexican theater of the Cold War, an internal conflict from the 1960s to the 1980s between the Mexican PRI-ruled government under the presidencies of Gustavo Díaz Ordaz, Luis Echeverría and José López Portillo, which were backed by the US government, and left-wing student and guerrilla groups. During the war, government forces carried out disappearances (estimated at 1,200), systematic torture, and "probable extrajudicial executions".

In the 1960s and 1970s, Mexico was persuaded to be part of both Operation Intercept and Operation Condor, developed between 1975 and 1978, with the pretext to fight against the cultivation of opium and marijuana in the "Golden Triangle", particularly in Sinaloa.

The operation, commanded by General José Hernández Toledo, was a flop with no major drug-lord captures; however, many abuses and acts of repression were committed.

The judicial investigation into State crimes against political movements was not opened until the end of the 71-year long PRI regime and the accession to power of Vicente Fox in 2000, which created the Special Prosecutor's Office for Social and Political Movements of the Past (FEMOSPP). However, despite revealing much about the history of the conflict, the FEMOSPP has not been able to finalize prosecutions against the main instigators of the Dirty War.

In March 2019, the President of Mexico, Andrés Manuel López Obrador, publicly released the archives of the defunct Federal Security Directorate, which contain a great amount of previously undisclosed information about the Dirty War and the political persecution by the PRI governments in the 20th century. López Obrador stated that "We lived for decades under an authoritarian regime which limited freedoms and persecuted those who struggled for social change" and issued an official apology on behalf of the Mexican State towards the victims of the repression. López Obrador further stated that judicial action will be taken against the surviving perpetrators of the repression, and promised that the surviving victims will be able to claim compensation under the law.

Events

The war was characterized by a backlash against the active student movement of the late 1960s which ended in the Tlatelolco massacre at a 1968 student rally in Mexico City, in which 30 to 300 (according to official reports; non-governmental sources claim death toll in the thousands) students were killed, and in the Corpus Christi massacre, another massacre of student demonstrators in Mexico City on June 10, 1971.

There were several barely connected groups fighting against the government during this period. Among the most important, the September 23 Communist League was at the forefront of the conflict, active in several cities throughout Mexico, drawing heavily from Christian Socialist and Marxist student organizations. They carried out confrontations with Mexican security forces, several kidnappings, and attempted to kidnap Margarita López Portillo, the sister of the president. In Guerrero, the Party of the Poor, fighting against landholder impunity and oppressive police practices in rural areas, was led by the ex-teacher Lucio Cabañas; they carried out ambushes of the army and security forces and the abduction of Guerrero's governor-elect.

Cessation of hostilities
The legalization of left-wing political parties in 1978 along with the amnesty of imprisoned and at large guerrillas caused a number of combatants to end militant struggle against the government. However, certain groups continued fighting, and the National Human Rights Commission states the hostilities continued into 1982.

In June 2002, a report prepared for Vicente Fox, the first president not from the Institutional Revolutionary Party (PRI) in 71 years, detailed the government's actions from 1964 to 1982. The report states, according to BBC News, that the Mexican army "kidnapped, tortured, and killed hundreds of rebel suspects" in the period and accused the Mexican state of genocide. The Mexican Special Prosecutor claimed the report was overly biased against the military and that it failed to detail crimes committed by rebels, including kidnappings, bank robberies, and assassinations. However, general consensus is that the report accurately assessed the government's culpability. Instead of ensuring the security of innocent civilians, it victimized them and killed them alike.

Guerrilla groups 
The year 1960 marked the beginning of a decade of terror in the region of Guerrero as the state slowly began to deal with the citizens and peasants there ever-more violently. The state enacted the acts of suppression on Guerrero to keep the numerous different political reform movements stifled, as the local people over time grew agitated with the way the government was wielding its power and meddling with their rights. As the citizens grew more determined to speak out against the government in the 1960s, the PRI continued to increase its terror tactics in the region. While that was done to keep the populace under its control, the constant stream of violence pushed many guerrillas to consider raising up arms against the PRI.

The rising of guerrilla groups in the 1960s and 1970s provided the state an excuse to focus its resources on suppressing the armed activities of the guerrillas. The army would become infamous for its tactics in repressing the rebels in the rural areas of Mexico, where such practices such as the death flights were initiated.

This period of state violence in the state of Guerrero helped to bring about numerous guerrilla organizations. One of the groups was the Party of the Poor (PDLP), which was influenced by Marxism and people like Che Guevara. That group tended to be focused more on the rural regions like Guerrero, where they would be more likely to find support among the peasants there. The PDLP actions become more violent towards the rich after events such as the 1967 Atoyac massacre, where leaders like Lucio Cabañas tried to use the peasants anger to bring about true revolution.

As the 1960s and 1970s would go on, the PDLP would gain attention around the nation for acts like its kidnapping of Ruben Figueroa who was a prominent  leader of the PRI. While this act inspired those downtrodden by the government, this also marked the decline of the organization as the government began to focus more on taking out this guerrilla group. Eventually the army found and killed Cabañas on December 2, 1974 in an attempt to cause his movement to fall apart. Another school teacher turned revolutionary, Genaro Vázquez Rojas, founded the National Revolutionary Civic Association (ACNR) as a response to the governments actions in Guerrero. These two leaders and their movements emerged as the armed phase of this social struggle against a corrupt government, which would continue long after the deaths of the leaders.

Torture 
Torture was one of the many tools used by the PRI-run state in its drive to keep the numerous guerrilla groups and political dissidents repressed. While torture was illegal in many countries during this time, the numerous authoritarian regimes that sprung up from the Cold War used it to great effect. The Mexican state used torture to get information from captured rebels and guerrillas about attacks and plans. This torturing would be done at any number of clandestine detention centers, where guerrillas would be sent to before arriving at a legal prison so as the state's activities would be kept secret from outside sources. Typically both male and female guerrilla prisoners would be tortured at these areas. It was more common for women to be sexually assaulted by their guards. This, combined with other forms of physical and psychological gender-based transgressions leads some to believe that the state employed this form of gender policing to try and deter women from breaking the regime's social and political norms.

The detaining and torturing of political prisoners became more systematic after the student uprisings in 1968, for the government decided that heavy-handed responses were necessary to deal with the unrest. This stage of violent and public repression  of differing ideals was similar to the regimes of the Southern Cone governments, such as Argentina.

Aftermath 
While Mexico's Dirty War has been over for a number of years, not much is known of the extent of the number of victims the war claimed, due to its elusive nature throughout its length. Part of the reason for this problem is that since there was no large-scale truth commission to bring justice to the perpetrators and closure for the victim's families, Mexico never had its "Pinochet moment" in regards to the war. From the early 2000s onward, some local investigations have been carried out by NGOs, providing some insight into the tactics and dynamics of the war, as well as the scale of crimes. One example, conducted by the Association of Relatives of Victims of Disappearance, Detention and Human Rights Violations in Mexico (AFADEM) documented over 470 disappearances at the hands of state forces during the 1970s just in the municipality of Atoyac. Another problem was the lack of response in the wake of the 2006 report by Carillo Prieto, which documented some of the atrocities inflicted by the PRI regime. Despite this evidence of numerous crimes that violated human rights, ex-president Echeverria and several other PRI officials had their cases dismissed and became free men. The failure by the government to address these problems of the past has been a cause of tension at times in Mexico, as citizens become distrustful of a state that does not address the old regime and its reign of terror.

See also
 Arturo Durazo Moreno
 Central American crisis
 Dirty War
 List of wars involving Mexico
 Mario Arturo Acosta Chaparro
 Military history of Mexico
 Miguel Nazar Haro
 Operation Condor
 Roma (2018 film)
 Rosario Ibarra
 Timeline of 1960s counterculture

References

Further reading
 Aviña, Alexander. "A War Against Poor People: Dirty Wars and Drug Wars in 1970s Mexico". In Pensado, Jaime M. and Enrique C. Ochoa. Mexico Beyond 1968, pp.134-152.
 Herrera Calderón, Fernando. "Working-Class Heroes: Barrio Consciousness, Student Power, and the Mexican Dirty War". In Pensado, Jaime M. and Enrique C. Ochoa. Mexico Beyond 1968, pp. 155-174.
 Herrera Calderón, Fernando and Adela Cedillo. Challenging Authoritarianism in Mexico: Revolutionary Struggles and the Dirty War, 1964-1982. Routledge 2012. 
 McCormick, Gladys I. "Torture and the Making of a Subversive During Mexico's Dirty War". In Pensado, Jaime M. and Enrique C. Ochoa. Mexico Beyond 1968, pp. 254-272.
 McCormick, Gladys I. "The Last Door: Political Prisoners and the Use of Torture in Mexico's Dirty War". The Americas 74, no. 1 (Jan. 2017): 57-81.
 Pansters, Wil G. "Zones and Languages of State-Making: From Pax Priista to Dirty War". In Pensado, Jaime M. and Enrique C. Ochoa. Mexico Beyond 1968, pp. 33-50.
Pansters, Wil G. ed. Violence, Coercion, and State-Making in Twentieth-Century Mexico: The Other Half of the Centaur. Stanford: Stanford University Press 2013.  
 Pensado, Jaime M. and Enrique C. Ochoa. Mexico Beyond 1968: Revolutionaries, Radicals, and Repression during the Global Sixties and Subversive Seventies. Tucson: University of Arizona Press 2018. 
Ulloa Bornemann, Alberto, and Arthur Schmidt. Surviving Mexico's Dirty War: A Political Prisoner's Memoir. Philadelphia: Temple University Press 2007.

History of Mexico
Dirty wars
Rebellions in Mexico
Wars involving Mexico
Political and cultural purges
Cold War conflicts
Cold War in Latin America
Anti-communist terrorism
Political repression
State-sponsored terrorism
Communism-based civil wars
Foreign relations of Mexico
Anti-communism in Mexico
Human rights abuses in Mexico
Political movements in Mexico
Military history of Mexico
Anarchism in Mexico
Socialism in Mexico
Communism in Mexico
Government of Mexico